Howick Group National Park (Cape York Peninsula Aboriginal Land) is a national park in Queensland, Australia, 1,689 km northwest of Brisbane. The national park was previously named Howick Group National Park until it was renamed on 28 November 2013.

Flora and fauna 
The national park is known to have 152 endemic species of plants and 118 endemic species of animals, of which 15 are rare or endangered species.

References

See also

 Protected areas of Queensland

National parks of Far North Queensland
Protected areas established in 1989
1989 establishments in Australia